Layangan Putus is an Indonesian drama web series produced by Manoj Punjabi under MD Entertainment. The storyline is based on a viral story that started with a story written on social media which was continued into a novel entitled Layangan Putus, written by the same person as pen name Mommy ASF. It starred Reza Rahadian, Putri Marino, and Anya Geraldine. The series premiered on WeTV and iflix on 26 November 2021, and also aired on RCTI on 9 February 2022. It went off-air on 22 January 2022.

Plot 
Kinan always feels that his household is a kite, with Aris and himself as masters. Now he is faced with the fact that Aris has another lover behind him; threatens his household to become a broken kite that doesn't aim at all.

Cast

Main 
 Reza Rahadian as Aris Pratama Sugarda: Kinan's ex-husband; Lydia's lover; Raya's father.
 Putri Marino as Kinan Aripurnami: Aris's ex-wife, Raya's father, Lola and Dita's best friend.
 Anya Geraldine as Lydia Permata Danira: Aris's lover, Raya's teacher.
 Frederika Alexis Cull as Miranda: Aris's business partner, Eros' ex-wife, Brandon's mother.
 Graciella Abigail as Bulan Raya Sugarda: Aris and Kinan's daughter.

Recurring 
 Ruth Marini as Atun: Kinan's maid.
 Lala Choo as Lastri: Kinan's maid.
 Raquel Katie as Lola: Kinan's lawyer, Kinan and Dita's best friend.
 Michelle Wanda as Dita: Kinan and Lola's best friend.
 Marthino Lio as Andre Davianto: Dita, Lola and Kinan's best friend.
 Ivan Kabul as Dr. Wira: Kinan's doctor.
 Yorda Emily as Farida: Kinan's mother.
 Ricky Wattimena as Alif Baihaqqi: Aris and Irfan's best friend.
 Brian Andrew as Dion Tanoto / Dion James Chandra: Lydia's business partner.
 Rayhan Cornelis as Brandon: Miranda and Eros's son.
 Nita Sofiani as Merry: Kinan's neighbors.
 Arif Brata as Irfan: Aris and Alif's best friend.
 Kamal Hafid as Jodi
 Stevana Dinda Rizky as Eros: Miranda's ex-husband, Brandon's father.
 Hendy Han as Freddy Wijaya: Aris's lawyer.
 Ilona Cecilia Budiman as Raya's mother friend school. 
 Gendis Dewanti as Kilo Lounge Waiter.

Reception 
The series Layangan Putus has been watched more than 15 million times in one day and several positions occupy the trending during the week. This series also successfully became a show that entered the ranks of "trending" in 25 countries.

In popular culture 
The clip from an episode where the lead character Kinan (Putri Marino) say "It’s my dream, not her" went viral due to Kinan expresses his emotions to Reza Rahadian who plays Aris who has an affair with her.

References

External links 
 
 

2021 web series debuts